The ninth season of Survivor Greece, the Greek version of the popular reality show Survivor, began airing on December 26, 2021, on Skai TV and also in Cyprus on Sigma TV. Giorgos Lianos returned as the host. Twelve players and twelve celebrities, who have been known in Greece through their work, are invited to survive on a deserted island, the exotic La Romana in Dominican Republic, having their luggage, the necessary clothes and basic food supply.

Contestants
The names of the original tribes were Mαχητές (Machites, meaning warriors), and Διάσημοι (Diasimoi,  meaning celebrities). On the first day, 24 contestants entered the game. In the fifth week, three new contestants entered the game: Aris Soiledis for the Diasimoi team, and Andreas Matthaiakakis and Thomaïs Emmanouilidou for the Machites team. In the eighth week, five new contestants entered the game: Katia Tarabanko, Giorgos Talantsev, Takis Karagounias and Sakis Arseniou for the Diasimoi team and Aggelos Poulis for the Machites team. On the tenth week the new contestant Stavroula Chrisaeidi for the Machites team entered the game. On the eleventh week, two new contestants entered the game: Jo Maridaki for Machites team and Stathis Schizas for Diasimoi team. In Episode 59 the two new tribes Red and Blue were created. On the fourteenth week, there were four new contestants: Konstantinos Emmanouil and Stella Andreadou for Blue team and Nikos Antonopoulos and Nikos Giannis for Red team.

Voting history

Nominations table

Matches

Team matches

Individual matches

Ratings
Official ratings are taken from AGB Hellas.

Notes

References

2021 Greek television seasons
2022 Greek television seasons
09
Television shows filmed in the Dominican Republic